Piera-Cassandra Maglio  (born 30 January 1976) is an Italian footballer who played as a midfielder for the Italy women's national football team. She was part of the team at the UEFA Women's Euro 2001. On club level she played for Bardolino Verona in Italy.

References

1976 births
Living people
Italian women's footballers
Italy women's international footballers
Place of birth missing (living people)
Women's association football midfielders